Kawauchi ( or ) may refer to:

Places
Kawauchi, Fukushima
Kawauchi, Aomori
Kawauchi, Ehime, now part of the city of Tōon, Ehime

People with the surname
Hiroshi Kawauchi, Japanese politician
Kōhan Kawauchi, Japanese screenwriter 
Rinko Kawauchi, Japanese photographer
Takaya Kawauchi, Japanese baseball player
Yuki Kawauchi, Japanese distance runner

See also
 Kawachi (disambiguation)
 Sendai (disambiguation)
 河内 (disambiguation)

Japanese-language surnames